Olaf Everson (6 February 1912 – 27 November 1995) was a New Zealand cricketer. He played one first-class match for Otago in 1943/44.

Everson was born at Auckland in 1912. His occupation was a "preacher". He died at Hamilton in 1995; an obituary was published in the New Zealand Cricket Annual the following year.

References

External links
 

1912 births
1995 deaths
New Zealand cricketers
Otago cricketers
Cricketers from Auckland